Longosomatidae is a family of polychaetes belonging to the order Spionida.

Genera:
 Heterospio Ehlers, 1874

References

Polychaetes